Sangue Bom (International title: Tangled Hearts) is a Brazilian access prime telenovela created and written by Maria Adelaide Amaral with Vincent Villari and, directed by Dennis Carvalho.

The series premiered on 29 April 2013 and ended on 1 November 2013 on TV Globo at  7:30 p.m. / 8:15 p.m. (BRT/AMT).

A total of 161 episodes of 45 minutes were originally planned to be produced, however, due to Globo's live coverage of the 2013 protests, Sangue Bom was not aired on 20 June and got the number of episodes reduced to 160.

Sophie Charlotte, Marco Pigossi,  Fernanda Vasconcellos, Jayme Matarazzo, Isabelle Drummond and Humberto Carrão star as the protagonists, while Ingrid Guimarães stars as the main antagonist.

Plot
Tangled Hearts follows the story of six young individuals who work hard to achieve their dreams and also dream of loving someone special and being loved as well. Amora, Bento and Fabio were raised at an orphanage at Capo Verde by Gilson and his wife, Selma. They each took their own path in life when Amora was adopted by actress Barbara Ellen, Fabio with a broke family in the countryside and Bento grew up to become a florist in a cooperative with Gilson, Selma and Giane, a childhood friend Who secretly has a crush on him.

Amora becomes a famous model and media personality and socialite Who is brattish and vain, and Malú, her adoptive sister is a responsible, simple and down to earth University student who is unloved by Barbara Ellen who considers her a mistake.

Cast

Special participation

Impact

Ratings

Broadcast

 Series broadcast at 20:15 (UTC−4) on states part of the Amazon time zone (from April 29, 2013 to October 19, 2013) and at 20:15 (UTC−3) or 19:15 (UTC−4) on states where Dailying saving time is not used (from October 21, 2013 to November 1, 2013).

 Series broadcast weekly double-length episodes.

References

External links 
 
 

2013 telenovelas
2013 Brazilian television series debuts
2013 Brazilian television series endings
Brazilian telenovelas
Brazilian LGBT-related television shows
TV Globo telenovelas
Television shows set in São Paulo
Portuguese-language telenovelas